Allen's Green is a village in Hertfordshire, England.

External links

Villages in Hertfordshire